South Haven is an unincorporated community in Noble Township, Wabash County, in the U.S. state of Indiana.

It is located within the city limits of Wabash.

Geography

References

Unincorporated communities in Wabash County, Indiana
Unincorporated communities in Indiana